The 78th Indianapolis 500 was held at the Indianapolis Motor Speedway in Speedway, Indiana on Sunday, May 29, 1994. The race was sanctioned by United States Auto Club (USAC), and was included as race number 4 of 16 of the 1994 PPG IndyCar World Series. For the second year in a row, weather was nary a factor during the month. Only one practice day was lost to rain, and pole day was only partially halted due to scattered showers. Warm, sunny skies greeted race day.

Al Unser Jr. won from the pole position, his second Indy 500 victory. Despite reliability issues with the engine and handling difficulties with the chassis, the three-car Penske team (Unser, Emerson Fittipaldi and Paul Tracy) dominated most of the month, and practically the entire race.

While Al Unser Jr. won the pole position, two-time former winner (1989, 1993) Emerson Fittipaldi dominated most of the race, leading a total of 145 laps. Fittipaldi was attempting to become the first back-to-back winner at Indy since Al Unser Sr. in 1970–1971. On lap 185, Fittipaldi was leading the race, and was looking to put Al Unser Jr. (who was running second) a lap down. Fittipaldi tagged the wall in turn 4, handing the lead to Unser with 15 laps to go. Unser was able to stretch his fuel and cruise to victory over rookie Jacques Villeneuve. Al Unser Jr. joined his father Al Sr. and uncle Bobby as winners of multiple 500s at Indianapolis.

The race marked the final Indy 500 for Mario Andretti (who retired at the end of the 1994 season) and Emerson Fittipaldi (who failed to qualify for the 1995 race and retired two months after the 1996 race, which was boycotted by CART). In addition, Indy veterans Al Unser Sr. and Johnny Rutherford both retired in the days leading up to the race. John Andretti, who had left CART and moved to the NASCAR Winston Cup Series, became the first driver to race in both the Indy 500 and Coca-Cola 600 in the same day, an effort that has become known as "Double Duty". This was also the second and final Indy 500 for Nigel Mansell, who was knocked out of the race in a bizarre crash with Dennis Vitolo.

Background
Nigel Mansell went on to win the 1993 CART championship, with 1993 Indy 500 winner Emerson Fittipaldi finishing second in points. Mansell returned to team up again with Mario Andretti at Newman Haas. Andretti embarked on a yearlong Arrivederci Mario tour, announcing he would retire at the conclusion of the 1994 CART season. The 1994 race would be his 29th and final start at Indy. Fittipaldi remained at Penske Racing, which expanded to a three-car effort for 1994, including Al Unser Jr. and Paul Tracy. Unser parted ways with Galles after a six-year stint, and was replaced there with rookie Adrián Fernández.

After a dismal season in Formula One, Michael Andretti returned to Indy car racing for 1994, signing with Ganassi. Andretti won the season opening Australian Grand Prix at Surfers Paradise. It was the first Indy car win for Ganassi, as well as the first win for the Reynard chassis (in its Indy car debut). Rahal-Hogan Racing, with drivers Bobby Rahal and Mike Groff, debuted the first Honda Indy car engine, the iron block Honda HRX Indy V-8.

Chevrolet dropped its support of the Ilmor engine program at Indy after 1993. For 1994, the 265C, the 265 C+, and 265D V-8 powerplants were badged the "Ilmor Indy V8."

After Michael Andretti won the season opener, Marlboro Team Penske won the next two races before Indy. Emerson Fittipaldi and Al Unser Jr. finished 1–2 at Phoenix, then Al Unser Jr. won at Long Beach.

Jim Nabors returned to sing the traditional "Back Home Again in Indiana" just months after receiving a liver transplant. Nabors had suffered a near-fatal case of Hepatitis B, which caused liver failure. Initially it was not expected that he would be able to attend the race in person.

Six days before opening day, the worldwide motorsports community was shaken by the death of Ayrton Senna at San Marino. Indy drivers Emerson Fittipaldi, Raul Boesel, and Maurício Gugelmin, were among those in attendance at the funeral, all three serving as pall-bearers.

Mercedes-Benz 500I

The most notable off-season activity involved Penske Racing and Ilmor. In the summer and fall of 1993, Penske and Ilmor engaged in a new engine project. Under complete secrecy, a  purpose-built, V-8 pushrod engine was developed. Mercedes eventually came on board with the project and badged the engine the Mercedes-Benz 500I. The engine was designed to exploit a loophole that had existed in USAC's rulebook since 1991. While CART sanctioned the rest of the IndyCar season, the Indianapolis 500 itself was conducted by USAC under slightly different technical regulations. This effort represented a rare instance during this era where considerable money and effort were invested in creating a powerplant uniquely for the Indy 500 (as the 500I would be illegal in any IndyCar-sanctioned event).

In an effort to appeal to mainstream car companies and smaller independent engine builders (both primarily based in the US), USAC permitted traditional, "stock-block" pushrod engines (generally defined as non-OHC units fitted with two valves per cylinder actuated by pushrod and rocker arm). Stock blocks saw some limited use at Indy in the early 1980s and by 1985 had become mainstream with the Buick V-6. Initially, Indy stock blocks were required to have some production-based parts. However, in 1991 USAC quietly lifted this requirement allowing purpose-built pushrod engines to be designed for racing from the ground up.

Team Penske tested and further developed the engine in secret in the winter and spring of 1994. Before Mercedes-Benz joined the effort, the engine was initially called the "265E" which followed Ilmor's standard naming convention for their previous DOHC racing engines. This was ostensibly to maintain in-house secrecy of the pushrod project from those working within Penske and Ilmor who were not involved. The 500I was mated with the race-winning Penske chassis, the PC-23. It was introduced to the public in April, just days before opening day at Indy.

Track improvements
During the off-season, the pit area was repaved. The individual pit boxes were changed to concrete, while the entrance and exit lanes were widened and repaved in asphalt.

A new scoring pylon was erected on the main stretch, replacing the landmark originally built in 1959.

Race schedule

Practice – Week 1

Saturday May 7 – Opening Day
Rain washed out opening day, the first time since 1975.

Sunday May 8
Dick Simon Racing cars of Lyn St. James, Raul Boesel, Hiro Matsushita, Dennis Vitolo, Hideshi Matsuda and Tero Palmroth were the first cars out on the track, creating a "Flying V" formation.

Paul Tracy took the first laps in the Penske PC-23/Mercedes 500I at 12:34 p.m. Al Unser Jr., however, was testing at Michigan International Speedway, reportedly "working on reliability." Tracy's fastest lap was 220.103 mph.

Bobby Rahal took the first laps at Indy in the Honda, with a fast lap of 219.791 mph. Scott Brayton, in the Menard Buick posted the fastest lap of the day at 227.658 mph.

Monday May 9
At 4:45 p.m., Mike Groff's Honda engine failed, which caused the car to spin and crash into the wall in the southchute. He was not seriously injured.

Defending Indy Lights champion Bryan Herta, who had started the month with Tasman Motorsports, was withdrawn from that entry, and signed with Foyt.

Emerson Fittipaldi (after 'shake down' laps on Sunday) turned in his first fast laps driving the Penske PC-23/Mercedes Benz 500I, completed a lap of 226.512 mph. Al Unser Jr. took to the track for the first time in the Mercedes as well. Michael Andretti led the speed chart in the new Reynard, at 227.038 mph.

Tuesday May 10
Raul Boesel broke the 230 mph barrier at 5:55 p.m., the first driver to do so since 1992. His lap of 230.403 was the fastest thus far for the month. The Penske-Mercedes was close behind, turning in their best laps of the month. Paul Tracy was second-fastest for the day at 229.961 mph, and Fittipaldi was third at 229.264 mph.

During the afternoon practice, an annular eclipse crossed over the state of Indiana, and the Speedway. Track temperatures cooled, and generally faster laps were observed during the phenomenon.

Wednesday May 11
A windy day kept speed down. Al Unser Jr. in a Penske PC-23/Mercedes Benz 500I, led the chart at 226.478 mph.

Thursday May 12
Emerson Fittipaldi drove his Penske PC-23/Mercedes Benz 500I to a lap of 230.438 mph, with a trap speed of 244 mph down the backstretch. Paul Tracy was second-quick at 228.444 mph (244 mph trap speed).

Friday May 13
At 3:37 p.m., Paul Tracy spun his Penske PC-23/Mercedes Benz 500I in turn 3, hit the outside wall, then crashed into the inside guardrail. He suffered a concussion, and was forced to sit out the first day of time trials.

Emerson Fittipaldi was quickest of the day at 230.138 mph, making him a favorite for the pole position.

Time Trials – Weekend 1

Pole day – Saturday May 14
A mix of sun and rain showers stretched the qualifying line throughout the afternoon. A short shower delayed the start of qualifying until 12:15 p.m. Rookie Hideshi Matsuda became the first driver in the field, posting a 4-lap average of 222.545 mph.

At 12:50 p.m., Raul Boesel took the provisional pole position with a run of 227.618 mph. Later, Jacques Villeneuve qualified as the fastest rookie, with a speed of 226.259 mph.

At 1:18 p.m., Al Unser Jr. became the first Penske driver to take the track, attempting to qualify one of the three Penske PC-23/Mercedes Benz 500I machines. His first lap of 225.722 mph was disappointingly slow, but his speed over the last three laps climbed dramatically. His final four-lap average of 228.011 mph took over the provisional pole position.

Bobby Rahal (220.178 mph) and Mike Groff (218.808 mph) completed slow runs in their Honda-powered machines, and were the slowest two cars of the day.

A second rain shower closed the track from about 2–5 p.m. When qualifying resumed, there was not enough time to complete the entire qualifying line. Among the runs were Lyn St. James (224.154 mph) tentatively putting her 5th fastest, and Al Unser, Sr. who waved off after a lap of 214 mph.

The 6 o'clock gun sounded with several drivers still in line, including Mario Andretti and Emerson Fittipaldi. Pole qualifying would be extended into the following day.

Second day – Sunday May 15
The pole qualifying line resumed where it left off from the previous day, with Mario Andretti first out. Emerson Fittipaldi was the final car eligible for the pole position, and took his run at 1:18 p.m. His speed of 227.303 mph was not enough to bump his teammate Al Unser Jr. off the pole, but qualified him in third position. The front row was rounded out by Raul Boesel, while Lyn St. James held on to qualify for the outside of the second row, the highest starting position for a female driver to-date.

After his crash Friday, Paul Tracy returned to the track Sunday. Since he sat out time trials on Saturday and missed his spot in line, he was ineligible for the pole position. He qualified as a second-day qualifier, and would line up his Penske PC-23/Mercedes Benz 500I 25th on race day. After two wave-offs on Saturday, Scott Brayton finally put his Menard-powered Lola in the field as the fastest qualifier for the second round.

Practice – Week 2

Monday May 16
A leisurely day of practice saw only 18 cars take laps. Emerson Fittipaldi, working on race set-ups, ran the best lap at 226.421 mph. Robby Gordon spent time shaking down back-up cars for his teammates Willy T. Ribbs and Mark Smith.

Tuesday May 17
Four-time Indy 500 winner Al Unser, Sr. officially announced his retirement from driving at a press conference. His son, pole winner Al Unser Jr. was sick, and rested away from the track.

Off the track, Rahal-Hogan Racing announced they had entered into a deal with Team Penske to lease two back-up cars. Driving the new Honda HRX Indy V-8s, Bobby Rahal and Mike Groff were the two slowest cars in the field, and risked being bumped. If Rahal were to not qualify, it would mark the second year in a row. Through a sponsorship connection, Roger Penske offered Rahal and Groff the use of two 1993 PC-22/Ilmor V-8 machines (2.65L). Rahal received an Ilmor D engine, while Groff received an Ilmor C+ engine. They were not the Mercedes-Benz 209I power plants, however they were competitive enough to comfortably make the field if needed. Paul Tracy shook down the cars before handing them over to the Rahal team.

Mark Smith (219.947 mph) was the fastest of the non-qualified drivers, and veteran Roberto Moreno took over Al Unser, Sr.'s car, starting a refresher test.

Wednesday May 18
Mark Smith (220.324 mph) was again the fastest of the non-qualified drivers. Mike Groff (221.560 mph), driving the 1993 Penske/Ilmor, was already practicing faster than his qualifying speed in the Honda.

Thursday May 19
A busy day of practice saw 36 cars complete 1,511 laps. John Paul Jr. (222.058 mph) was the fastest non-qualified car.

Friday May 20
The final full day of practice saw 32 cars complete 1,154 laps. John Paul Jr. (221.691 mph) was yet again the fastest non-qualified car.

Time Trials – Weekend 2

Third day – Saturday May 21
John Paul Jr. was the first car out for the afternoon, and safely put his car into the field. Later, Scott Goodyear completed a run at 220.737 mph. With temperatures in the 80s, the track sat dormant for most of the afternoon. That led to a ceremonial final lap for three time Indianapolis 500 champion Johnny Rutherford, driving the exact same car A. J. Foyt had driven the previous year in his ceremonial final lap.

At 5:37 p.m., Mark Smith (220.683 mph) filled the field to 33 cars. Davy Jones (the teammate to Scott Goodyear at King Racing) made the field in car #40T at 223.817 mph. Mike Groff and Bobby Rahal, the two slowest cars in the field, saw their Honda-powered machines bumped from the field, and re-qualified in the borrowed Penske-Ilmor cars. Both drivers improved their speeds significantly, with Rahal now the seventh-fastest car overall in the field. Both Rahal and Groff were safely in the field, and would avoid missing the race as the team had done in 1993.

The day ended with Scott Goodyear (220.737 mph), driving car #40 for King Racing, on the bubble. Gary Bettenhausen, after lapping in the 223 mph range, crashed during a practice run, damaging the rear end of the car. The team would be forced to make quick repairs overnight in order to be ready to attempt to qualify on Bump Day.

*on the bubble

Bump day – Sunday May 22
Another hot day (89 degrees) saw the cars stay off the track most of the afternoon. Marco Greco made the first qualifying attempt at 5:35 p.m. Greco bumped Scott Goodyear (car #40) from the field. The move put Bryan Herta (220.992 mph), driving for Foyt, on the bubble. Herta had practiced in his back-up car at over 223 mph, but the team decided not to withdraw the primary car prematurely.

Geoff Brabham was the next driver to make an attempt. His first lap was fast enough to bump Herta, but the second and third laps dropped off, and the team waved off the run. Mark Smith returned to the track, trying to break the "Curse of the Smiths" at the Speedway, and bump his way back into the field. On the first lap, however, he wrecked in the first turn.

After wrecking his car in practice Saturday morning, Gary Bettenhausen made a last-ditch effort to bump his way into the field. He managed only 218 mph, and waved off after two laps. Just before the 6 o'clock gun, Willy T. Ribbs made a long-shot attempt to make the field. After a lap of 216 mph, then dropping to 212 mph, he waved off and time trials came to a close.

After second-guessing their strategy overnight, the Foyt team ultimately made the right decision and did not withdraw Bryan Herta from the field. The hot conditions Sunday worked in their favor, and Herta held on as the 33rd-fastest qualifier. Not since A. J. Foyt was the 32nd-fastest car in the field in 1973 had the Foyt team been so close to being bumped and missing the race entirely.

After qualifying was over, King Racing swapped drivers for its primary car. Davy Jones was removed from the #40T entry, and full-time driver Scott Goodyear was placed in the car. The move required Goodyear to start from the 33rd starting position.

Starting grid

 Scott Goodyear and Davy Jones were teammates for King Racing. Goodyear was the full-time primary driver, and Jones (who had incidentally left Foyt before start of the month) the second team driver. At the close of qualifying, Jones had qualified 29th (the overall 9th-fastest car in the field), but Goodyear was bumped. As a gesture to the team and sponsor requests, Goodyear took Jones' place behind the wheel on race day. The driver switch required the car to be moved to the rear of the field. The move mirrored a nearly identical situation for Goodyear in the 1992 race.

Alternates
 First alternate: Davy Jones (#40/60) – Switched cars with Scott Goodyear
 Second alternate: Mark Smith (#15) – Bumped

Failed to qualify

 = Indianapolis 500 rookie = Former Indianapolis 500 winner

Race summary

Pre Race
Hours before the start, Al Unser Sr. took a ceremonial final lap of the track in an IndyCar, the same car he won the 1987 Indianapolis 500 with.

General Chuck Yeager lead the flyover in a P-51 Mustang.

Start

Clear blue skies dawned on race day, with temperatures in the mid-70s. The command to start engines was made on-time at 10:52 a.m. EST, and the field pulled away for the pace laps. Pole-sitter Al Unser Jr. led fellow front-row starters Emerson Fittipaldi and Raul Boesel.

As the field came around for the start, Penske teammates Unser and Fittipaldi, driving the Mercedes-powered entries, took off out of turn four. They weaved down the frontstretch single-file, blocking, and leaving behind Boesel and the rest of the field behind. USAC officials decided not to wave off the start, and Unser led into turn one. It quickly became evident to competitors and media that the Penske-Mercedes machines were the class of the field, as many had predicted.

First half
On lap 6, Dennis Vitolo spun in turn four, but continued causing the first caution flag of the race. Later on lap 20, Roberto Guerrero crashed in turn two. Unser went on to lead the first 23 laps. On lap 23, as the leaders pitted, Mario Andretti dropped out early of his final "500" with ignition problems.

Al Unser Jr. stalled exiting the pits (a concern going into the race for the Mercedes) and Emerson Fittipaldi took the lead after the first sequence of pit stops. The yellow came back out again when Mike Groff and Dominic Dobson touched wheels and crashed in Turn 1.

At the restart, Michael Andretti suffered a puncture, and pitted for new tires.  He stalled the car leaving the pits, and subsequently went a lap down. Eddie Cheever and Nigel Mansell were both given black flags for passing Raul Boesel prior to the restart, forcing both to make stop and go penalty passes through the pits.

By lap 85, Fittipaldi had stretched his lead to 24.6 seconds over second-place Unser. Jacques Villeneuve was a lap down, running as high as third.

On Lap 92 Hideshi Matsuda crashed in Turn 2. Under the yellow, John Paul Jr. then spun and crashed in turn 3. As the field was circulating through turn three warm-up lane behind the pace car, Dennis Vitolo was barreling down the backstretch trying to catch up with the field. He misjudged the speed of the field, and approached the line of cars too fast. He ran into the back of John Andretti's car, touched wheels with him, and spun forward in a clockwise rotation. The back of the car then rammed the back of Nigel Mansell's car, and climbed up it sideways. Al Unser Jr., among others, narrowly escaped the incident. Vitolo was found on top of Mansell, and the cars were sideways in the infield grass. Hot coolant and oil began to leak from Vitolo's car, and dripped into Mansell's cockpit. Mansell scurried out of the car and was tackled to the ground by corner workers in an effort to put out any fire. Mansell later stormed out of the infield medical care center, angrily refusing treatment. Vitolo admitted blame for the incident.

At the halfway point, Unser (23) and Fittipaldi (75) combined to lead 98 of the first 100 laps. The third Penske entry driven by Paul Tracy, however, began smoking during the lap 92 yellow and dropped out with turbocharger failure.

Second half

Early contenders Raul Boesel (overheating) and Scott Brayton (spark plug) both dropped out in the second half. Fittipaldi continued to dominate, pulling away at will. On Lap 121 he set the fastest lap of the race at 40.783 seconds, equaling .

During a round of pit stops by Fittipaldi and Unser, rookie Jacques Villeneuve led five laps (125-129) before pitting himself. On lap 133, Fittipaldi was forced to return to the pits to remove a plastic bag from his radiator inlet.

A long stretch of green flag racing followed. Fittipaldi quickly caught Unser and extended his lead. By lap 157, they were the only two cars on the lead lap.

Finish
With less than 25 laps to go, Fittipaldi led Unser by almost 40 seconds. Third place Villeneuve was over a lap down. Fittipaldi was in need of one more splash-and-go pit stop for fuel before the race was over. Unser, however, was expected to make it to the finish. With 20 laps to go, Fittipaldi lapped Unser, and was a lap ahead of the entire field.

Fittipaldi's team scheduled a "timed" splash & go fuel-only stop for lap 194. Jockeying for position, Unser unlapped himself on lap 183. Two laps later, Unser was just ahead of Fittipaldi as they approached turn 4. Fittipaldi admitted a driver error as he drove over the inside rumble strips causing the rear tires to lose grip. Fittipaldi's car slid loose, and the right rear wheel tagged the outside wall exiting turn 4. After leading 145 laps, Fittipaldi's crashed car slid to a stop down the main stretch. The crash handed Unser the lead of the race, with Jacques Villeneuve on the lead lap in second.

Arie Luyendyk blew an engine during the caution for Fittipaldi's crash. Unser was leading, but lost use of his radio, and the team was concerned about fuel mileage. The green came out with ten laps to go. Unser held a comfortable lead over Villeneuve, who was mired deep in traffic.

On Lap 196, Stan Fox, who was running in the top ten, crashed in turn one. The caution came out for clean-up, and erased any doubts about Unser's fuel mileage. Unser ended up winning the race under yellow. Unser won his second Indy 500, and the Penske-Mercedes 500I pushrod engine won in its first and only race. The win came on his father's 55th birthday, twenty-three years to the day after Unser Sr. won his second Indy 500.  Villeneuve held on to finish second and won the rookie of the year award. Michael Andretti was penalized one lap for passing under caution, elevating Bobby Rahal to third place. Rahal had charged from the 28th starting position to third in the borrowed 1993 Penske-Ilmor machine.

John Andretti finished 10th, then flew to Charlotte Motor Speedway to compete in the Coca-Cola 600. He was the first driver to do "Double Duty", competing in both races on the same day.

Box score

  Includes bonus point for winning the pole position.
  Bonus point for leading the most laps.
 All cars used Goodyear tires.

Post-race CART PPG IndyCar World Series Standings

Post race
Almost immediately after the race, both USAC and CART separately evaluated the situation that stemmed from the Mercedes-Benz 500I. USAC was initially willing to allow the pushrod engines in 1995, but were concerned about the potential for escalating costs. CART, as it had previously, refused to allow the engine increased boost at the events they sanctioned, effectively rendering it uncompetitive at those races.

Two weeks after the race, USAC announced that for 1995, the 209 cid purpose-built pushrod engines would be allowed 52 inHG of "boost" (down from 55 inHG). The traditional "stock block" production-based engines (e.g., Buick & Menard) would still be allowed 55 inHG. Meanwhile, the overhead cam 2.65L V-8 engines would stay at 45 inches. Other engine manufacturers, including Cosworth and Menard were considering 209 pushrod engines (Ilmor Engineering had already taken 30 customer orders for 500i engines for the 1995 race), and it became possible that to be competitive on the CART circuit, teams might require two separate engines for the season—a 2.65L OHC for the CART-sanctioned events, and a pushrod engine for Indianapolis singly—a daunting task which was expected to escalate costs.

During the summer of 1994, Tony George announced his plans to start the Indy Racing League in 1996, with an emphasis on cost-saving measures. On August 11, 1994, USAC changed its decision, and scaled back the boost for the purpose-built pushrod engines further to 48 inches; and outlawing it outright for 1996. The move was considered by Roger Penske as "politically motivated," and ultimately set back the Penske Team going into 1995. Observers negatively compared the radical rules change to way USAC handled the Granatelli Turbine in the late 1960s.

After the rules change, the 209-cid Mercedes-Benz 500I never raced again, but boasted a perfect 100% pole position and race winning record at Indianapolis, its only start in professional competition.

Despite reverting to the Ilmor D powerplant for the remainder of the 1994 CART season, Marlboro Team Penske continued to dominate. The three Penske drivers won 12 (of 16) races, including five 1-2-3 finishes. Penske swept the top three in the final championship points standings, with Al Unser Jr. winning the championship, Fittipaldi second, and Tracy third.

The 1994 Indy 500 would prove to be the final victory for a Penske-manufactured chassis at the Speedway.  The following year, the 1995-spec Penske chassis, the PC-24, proved to be noncompetitive in time trials (despite a promising test in mid-April 1995). The team failed to qualify with it or the Lola and Reynard chassis that were borrowed from other teams as alternates. By the time the team returned to the race in 2001, in-house chassis manufacturing had ended in favor of using customer chassis.

Only 69 days after the race, the Indianapolis Motor Speedway ushered in a new era, hosting the Inaugural running of the Brickyard 400.

Broadcasting

Radio
The race was carried live on the IMS Radio Network. Bob Jenkins served as chief announcer for the fifth year. Johnny Rutherford, who retired as a driver during the month, returned to serve as "driver expert." Historian Donald Davidson celebrated his 30th year on the broadcast.

The on-air crew returned intact for 1994, which marked the fourth consecutive year the crew has remained nearly exactly the same (1991–1994). This was the last year for pit reporters Brian Hammons and Chris McClure. This was also Gary Lee's last year in Turn 2.

The broadcast was carried on hundreds of affiliates in all 50 states of the U.S., as well as AFN and World Harvest Radio International, reaching all continents including Antarctica. The broadcast was heard in the UK on Autosport Racing Line.

Television
The race was carried live flag-to-flag coverage in the United States on ABC Sports. Paul Page served as host and play-by-play announcer. Newcomer and former Indy winner Danny Sullivan joined Bobby Unser and Sam Posey as color commentators. Sullivan, who tentatively retired from IndyCar racing in 1994, began dabbling in NASCAR as well as broadcasting. Sullivan took the turn four reporting location, while Bobby Unser reported from turn two. Posey remained in the booth with Page.

With the addition of Sullivan, the same crew from 1990–1993 returned. This was the first 500 broadcast to feature a "Score bug." A transparent digit was located on the upper right corner of the screen which counted down the number of laps remaining in the race. New on-board camera angles debuted, including a rear-wing mount on Michael Andretti's car, as well as a forward-facing camera mounted in front of the left rear wheel on Robby Gordon's car, which captured a spectacular duel with Raul Boesel. Bobby Rahal's car also featured a new nose-cam, the first such at the 500.

Notes

See also
 1994 PPG Indy Car World Series

References

Works cited
 1993 Indianapolis 500 Daily Trackside Reports
 Indianapolis 500 History: Race & All-Time Stats – Official Site
 1994 Indianapolis 500 Radio Broadcast, Indianapolis Motor Speedway Radio Network

Further reading
 Mercedosaurus Rex at Indianapolic Park

Indianapolis 500 races
Indianapolis 500
Indianapolis 500
1994 in American motorsport
1994 in CART